Shripad Damodar Satwalekar (19 September 1867 – 31 July 1968) was a polymath with interests in painting, social health, Ayurveda, Yoga, and Vedic literature.  He was also the founder of the Swadhyay Mandal - A Vedic Research Institute.

Early life and education
Shripad Damodar Satwalekar was born in the Princely state of Sawantwadi, now part of Sindhudurg district in the Present day Indian state of Maharashtra to Damodar Pant and Lakshmi Bai. He attended J J School of Art in Bombay and worked for six months at the same institute as a tutor.

Artistic career
Satwalekar began his career as an artist, painter, and photographer with a studio in the city of Lahore, Punjab State. He mainly painted portraits of Maharajas and other prominent personalities of the day. In 1900, he opened his own painting studio in South Hyderabad.
He moved to the Princely State of Aundh with a strong patronage offered by the then Maharaja of the State, Bhawanrao Pant Pratinidhi.

Literary works
Satwalekar was interested in both individual and social health, Ayurveda, Yoga, and Vedas (particularly in the analysis of the Vedas at the level of adhibhuta) and wrote several books on these subjects, including '
Vaidika Yajña Saṃsthā, 
Sparśāsparśa, 
Agni-devatā Mantra-saṅgraha, 
Indra-devatā Mantra-saṅgraha, Āgama-nibandha-mālā, 
Yoga-sādhanā-grantha-mālā, the 
Vaidika vyākhyāna-mālā series, 
Subodha Bhāṣya, etc. 
 Marathi translation of Dayanand Saraswati's Satyarth Prakash 
Rigveda Bhaashya Bhoomika by Dayanand Saraswati - Marathi translation
Rigveda Samhita
 Atharveda in Hindi.
Sanskrit Svayam Shikshak (संस्कृत स्वयं-शिक्षक) - Self-learning book for learners of Sanskrit through the medium of Marathi. These were also available in Hindi and English("Sanskrit Self Teacher").
Puruṣārtha-Bodhinī-Bhāṣā-Ṭīkā - A four volume Commentary on Bhagavad Gita -  S.Rama calls this the best commentary on the Gita by a 20th century author
 Translation of the Mahabharata - The Government of India assigned the task of translating the constituted text of the Mahabharata published by the Bhandarkar Oriental Research Institute to Satwalekar. After his death, the task was taken up by Shrutisheel Sharma.

Social work
As early as in 1884, he started an institute for Sanskrit enthusiasts, Samskruta Vyaakhyaana Mandala. He established the Vivekavardhini Vidyaalaya, a public lecture hall, a gymnasium for young people, and so forth. For years he was associated with the Arya Samaj and the Theosophical Society. At one point of time, he served as a teacher of Vedas and painting at Kangadi Gurukula in Haridwar.

Promoter of yoga and ayurveda
Satwalekar was associated with several social service and outreach activities. He was a proponent of yoga and advised Gandhi on the subject. During his stay in Aundh he worked with the Raja Bhawanrao to promote Surya Namaskar.

Family
Satwalekar's son, Madhav Satwalekar (1915 – 2006) was also a renowned painter and artist in his own right.

Awards,honors and recognitions
Satwalekar was awarded the Padma Bhushan in 1968. He was conferred the Mayo Award twice, once for painting and once for sculpting.

References

1867 births
Writers from Maharashtra
Indian independence activists from Maharashtra
Recipients of the Padma Bhushan in literature & education
Year of death unknown
People from Ratnagiri district
19th-century Indian photographers
19th-century Indian writers
Photographers from Maharashtra
Sir Jamsetjee Jeejebhoy School of Art alumni